Tim Chen may refer to:

Tim Chen (corporate executive), Chinese corporate executive
Tim Chen (entrepreneur), co-founder and CEO of NerdWallet